Antons Jemeļins (born 19 February 1984 in Liepāja) is a Latvian footballer, who played as a centre-back.

Club career
Jemeļins started his career with Liepājas Metalurgs in 2004. He scored one goal in the 2005 Virslīga season when the club beat FK Rīga 6-0 on 21 September 2005. He also played for Liepājas Metalurgs reserves in 2005 scoring four goals and 2006 scoring two goals.

International career
Jemeļins has played for Latvia national under-21 football team. He was in the squad for the 2006 UEFA European Under-21 Football Championship qualification matches. On 2 November 2005 Jemeļins was firstly called up to Latvia national football team by manager by that time manager Jurijs Andrejevs for a friendly match against Belarus on 12 November. In May 2012 Jemeļins was re-called to the national team by the manager Aleksandrs Starkovs for the Baltic Cup matches in June. Latvia went on to win the tournament but Jemeļins remained an unused substitute during both matches.

Honours
Club
 Virsliga champion: (2) 2005, 2009
 Virsliga runner-up: (5) 2004, 2006, 2007, 2008, 2011
 Moldovan National Division runner-up: (1) 2014
 Latvian Cup winner (1) 2006
 Baltic League champion: (1) 2007

National team
 Baltic Cup winner (1) 2012

References

External links

1984 births
Living people
Sportspeople from Liepāja
Latvian footballers
FK Liepājas Metalurgs players
FK Spartaks Jūrmala players
FC Tiraspol players
FK Atlantas players
FK Ventspils players
FK Liepāja players
Latvian expatriate footballers
Expatriate footballers in Moldova
Latvian expatriate sportspeople in Moldova
Expatriate footballers in Lithuania
Latvian expatriate sportspeople in Lithuania
Latvia international footballers
Latvian people of Russian descent
Association football defenders